The Malmquist Index (MI) is a bilateral index that can be used to compare the production technology of two economies. It is named after Professor Sten Malmquist, on whose ideas it is based. It is also called the Malmquist Productivity Index.

The MI is based on the concept of the Production function. This is a function of maximum possible production, with respect to a set of inputs pertaining to capital and labour.

While the production function would normally apply to an enterprise, it is possible to calculate it for an entire region or nation. This would be called the aggregate production function. 

To calculate the Malmquist Index of economy A with respect to economy B, we must substitute the labour and capital inputs of economy A into the production function of B, and vice versa. The formula for MI is given below.

where

Note that the MI of A with respect to B is the reciprocal of the MI of B with respect to A. If the MI of A with respect to B is greater than 1, the aggregate production technology of economy A is superior to that of economy B.

The Malmquist Index was introduced in the 1982 paper, "Multilateral Comparisons of Output, Input and Productivity Using Superlative Index Numbers", by Douglas W. Caves, Laurits R. Christensen and W. Erwin Diewert.

Notes

References

Definition on About.com

 Caves, Douglas W & Christensen, Laurits R & Diewert, W Erwin, 1982. "Multilateral Comparisons of Output, Input, and Productivity Using Superlative Index Numbers," Economic Journal, Royal Economic Society, vol. 92(365), pages 73-86, March.
 Caves, Douglas W & Christensen, Laurits R & Diewert, W Erwin, 1982. "The Economic Theory of Index Numbers and the Measurement of Input, Output, and Productivity," Econometrica, vol. 50(6), pages 1393-1414, November.
 Alexandra Daskovska & Léopold Simar & Sébastien Bellegem, 2010. "Forecasting the Malmquist productivity index," Journal of Productivity Analysis, Springer, vol. 33(2), pages 97-107, April. 
 Färe, R., Grosskopf, S., Norris, M., & Zhang, Z. 1994. Productivity growth, technical progress, and efficiency change in industrialized countries. The American Economic Review 84, pages 66–83.
 Simar, Leopold & Wilson, Paul W., 1999. "Estimating and bootstrapping Malmquist indices," European Journal of Operational Research, Elsevier, vol. 115(3), pages 459-471, June. ]
  Mayer, A. and Zelenyuk, V. 2014. "Aggregation of Malmquist productivity indexes allowing for reallocation of resources," European Journal of Operational Research, Elsevier, vol. 238(3), pages 774-785.
  Zelenyuk, V. 2006. "Aggregation of Malmquist productivity indexes," European Journal of Operational Research, vol. 174(2), pages 1076-1086.

Economic indicators